Hasanuzzaman Khan Bablu (born 5 May 1955), is a retired Bangladeshi football player and manager. At club level, Bablu is most well known for representing Gopibagh based Brothers Union. In Dhaka football, he has scored 75 goals including a hattrick. Bablu also represented Bangladesh in the 1980 AFC Asian Cup, and played for the country from 1975 till 1982. After retiring, he managed the national team as an interim in 2000, 2003 and 2006.

Club career

Brothers Union
In 1973, when Brothers Union coach Abdul Gafur Baloch started gathering players for the club's youth team, alongside Mohammed Mohsin, Bablu became one of the first products of the youth team to make his way into the main squad. The same year he played for the club in the Dhaka Third Division League, which was the first time Brothers Union entered professional football, after the 1971 Liberation War. Over the next two years, Bablu became one of the highest goalscorers in both of Dhaka's Third Division and Second Division Leagues, as Brothers achieved consecutive promotions to enter the Dhaka League, in 1975. His combination with Mohsin was an integral part to the club's success, with Mohsin becoming the top-scorer during both of their lower division title triumphs.

He quickly made a name for himself when the newly promoted Brothers made their top-flight debut in 1975, claiming a 1–0 victory over defending champions Abahani Krira Chakra. In 1976, during a league game against East End Club, Bablu who had scored two goals already, dribbled past the entire East End defence only bring the ball back to his own half and sit on top of it. Bablu claimed to have challenged the opponent players to take the ball off of him, however following his antics the referee booked Bablu, who was immediately substituted. 

Bablu attracted the interest of Sheikh Kamal, who invited him to join Abahani, and though the deal was agreed by both clubs it later collapsed after the 15 August 1975 coup d'état. Although during his time with The Oranges he failed to win the league title, Bablu was part of the Brothers team that won the first edition of the Federation Cup in 1980, during which he was the club captain. Bablu was also part of the team that became the first Bangladeshi side to win the Aga Khan Gold Cup, although both titles were shared with Mohammedan SC and Bangkok Bank respectively. During their Aga Khan Gold Cup triumph, Bablu scored in the semi-final against Oman XI in a 3–1 victory.

Departure and return
In 1983, Bablu left Brothers Union after Mohammed Mohsin's injury lead to a slump in the club's form. Bablu joined Mohammedan SC, where he won the 1983 Federation Cup, however, Bablu could not replicate the performances he had with Brothers. The following year Bablu changed clubs again, joining Abahani Krira Chakra where he regained his form. With Abahani, Bablu won his first Dhaka League title during his lone year at the club, before moving to Dhaka Wanderers in 1985. Bablu returned to Brothers Union in 1986, and retired the same year.

International career
In 1975, the same year when Brothers Union made their top-tier debut, Bablu got a national team call-up from Abdur Rahim who was the Bangladesh's coach at the time. Bablu travelled with the team to Malaysia where they took part in the Merdeka Cup. Bablu then played for the Bangladesh U19 team at the 1978 AFC Youth Championship in Dhaka. He also captained the U19 team during the 1980 AFC Youth Championship qualifiers. Bablu guided the youth national team to qualification as they finished group runners-up behind Qatar U19.

He represented the senior team at the 1978 Asian Games and the 1979 Korean President's Cup. Bablu was also part of the national team during the qualifiers and the main stage of the 1980 AFC Asian Cup. He reprsented the Bangladesh Red team, during the first Bangladesh President's Gold Cup, in 1981. Bablu's last appearance for the national team was in a 0–9 defeat to Iran, at Pakistan's Quaid-E-Azam International Cup (1982).

Coaching career
Bablu started his coaching career with the Bangladesh U16, in 1991. He the coached Brothers Union from 1997 to 1998, before spending a months with Abahani as coach. His greatest success while coaching came during his time with Mohammedan SC. Bablu lead Mohammedan SC to their 18th Dhaka Premier Division League title in 1999.

In 2000, Bablu was the interim head coach of the Bangladesh national team, during the a friendly match held in London against India, and also during the 2004 AFC Asian Cup qualifiers held in Hong Kong. In July 2006, he replaced Andrés Cruciani as Bangladesh interim head coach, for the second half of the 2007 AFC Asian Cup qualifiers. In 2007, he managed Bangladesh at the 2007 Merdeka Cup, in which were all non FIFA matches, and after the tournament he retired from coaching.

Personal life
Born in Rajshahi, Bangladesh, Bablu started his football career while studying in Sirajganj, where he won the best player award in an inter-school football tournament. Bablu's father A Z Khan was a police superintendent while his mother Nurjahan Begum was a housewife, he grew up with five brothers and two sisters. Bablu's brother-in-law Abul Kashem was the director of Bangladesh Wapda FC, and also provided financial support to Bablu during the early days of his career. In 1980, Bablu married the younger sister of his Brothers Union teammate Shahiduddin Ahmed Selim.

In 2006, Bablu was received the National Sports Awards.

He also served as the president of Sonali Otit Club (organization of former footballers).

Honours

Player
Brothers Union
 Dhaka Third Division Football League = 1973
 Dhaka Second Division Football League = 1974
 Federation Cup = 1980* 
 Aga Khan Gold Cup = 1981–82*

Mohammedan SC
 Federation Cup = 1983

Abahani Krira Chakra
 Dhaka League = 1984

Manager
Mohammedan SC
 Dhaka Premier Division League = 1999

Awards and accolades
 2006 − National Sports Award.

References

Living people
1955 births
Bangladeshi footballers
Bangladesh international footballers
Pakistan international footballers
Bangladesh youth international footballers
Brothers Union players
Mohammedan SC (Dhaka) players
Abahani Limited (Dhaka) players
People from Rajshahi District
Association football midfielders
Bangladeshi football managers
Bangladesh national football team managers
1980 AFC Asian Cup players
Asian Games competitors for Bangladesh
Footballers at the 1978 Asian Games
Recipients of the Bangladesh National Sports Award